American actress and singer Idina Menzel has released six studio albums, fifteen singles and two live albums. She is dubbed as the "Streisand of her generation" by various media outlets. She became the first artist with both a Billboard Top 10 hit and a Tony Award for acting with her global smash hit "Let It Go". Her album "Holiday Wishes" remains her highest charting album on Billboard 200, peaking at #6 and also debuted at #1 on Billboard’s Holiday Albums Chart. Let It Go stormed the charts and became a pop culture phenomenon. It became the fifth biggest-selling song of 2014, selling 10.9 million worldwide via IFPI. Menzel was Billboard's 48th top performing artist of 2014 and she also the 9th Top Hot 100 artist of the same year. Let It Go is certified 8× Platinum in the US, according to RIAA and has sold a million units in South Korea and United Kingdom.

She produced and released her debut album, Still I Can't Be Still, in 1998. One single from the album "Minuet", made the Radio & Records CHR/Pop Tracks chart at number 48 in October 1998. Her second album, Here, was released independently in 2004. Her third solo album, I Stand, was released on January 29, 2008. The album debuted at number 58 in the Billboard 200, making it the first solo album by Menzel to make the charts. Menzel wrote many of the songs on her album. Menzel voiced the character of Queen Elsa in the Disney-animated film Frozen, which was released in November 2013. Her performance received praise from film critics, much of it focused on her performance of "Let It Go". Her fourth studio album, Holiday Wishes, was released in October 2014. Her latest album, Idina, was released in September 2016.

Albums

Studio albums

Live albums

Cast recordings

Soundtracks

EPs
Defying Gravity, May 2007 (remix EP)
Defying Gravity (DJ version), May 2007 (remix EP)
Gorgeous, December 2007 (remix EP #1)
Gorgeous, January 2008 (remix EP #2)
Acoustic, August 2008 (acoustic version EP)
Idina Menzel, April 2010
Beaches (Soundtrack From The Lifetime Original Movie), January 13, 2017

Singles

As lead artist

As featured artist

Other charted songs

Other appearances

Notes

References

Pop music discographies
Discographies of American artists